Andrew Anthony FitzGerald (born 22 February 1940; Gatton, Queensland) is a former Queensland, Australia, National Party politician who served in the state's Legislative Assembly for Lockyer from 1980 to 1998.

Political career
He was the Government Whip under Premiers Joh Bjelke-Petersen and Mike Ahern from 7 February 1987 to 31 August 1989, when Ahern promoted him to Minister of Justice. He served in that role until Russell Cooper won a leadership spill on 25 September of that year and moved Fitzgerald to Minister for Community Services and Minister for Emergency Services and Administrative Services, a role he served in until the Coalition lost power on 7 December 1989 after the 1989 election. He served as Shadow Minister for Mines and Energy under Cooper. Rob Borbidge made him Justice and Corrective Services spokesman after winning the leadership in December 1991. He was appointed Leader of Coalition Business in November 1992, in which capacity he served as Leader of the Opposition Business until February 1996, and Leader of the House until he lost his seat at the 1998 election.

References

1940 births
Living people
National Party of Australia members of the Parliament of Queensland